This is an episode list for the Japanese jidaigeki television series Lone Wolf and Cub.

Series 1973–1976

Season 1
Season one ran from April 1 to September 30, 1973. 
 My Son and My Sword for Hire
 Oyuki of the Gomune (Note: This episode has subsequently been removed from all TV broadcasts and DVD releases)
 Fangs of the Wolf
 Ikkoku-Bashi Bridge
 Highway of Assassins
 The Lowly Maid
 Amya and Anema
 The Guns of Sakai
 The Castle Wall Attack
 Six Roads to Infinity
 Baby Cart on the River Styx
 Deer Hunters
 O-Chiyo's Boat
 No Betrayal
 North to South, East to West
 Night of Fangs
 Cloud Tiger, Wind Dragon
 Executioner Asaemon
 Half Mat, One Mat, Two And A Half Go Of Rice
 The 8 Gate Attack Formation
 Chrysanthemum Inn
 The Crossing Guard
 The Tragedy Of Beku No Ji
 Thread of Tears
 The Yagyu Letter
 Daigoro's Song
 Drifting Shadows

Season 2
Season two ran from April 7 to September 29, 1974. 
 Blackfaces of Death
 Dark Southern Winds
 Yagyu Five-Prong Attack
 The Late Autumn Rain
 Mid Winter Arrival
 The Decoy
 The Wolf Cometh
 Japanese Silver Leaf
 Women's Castle
 Exorcism Day
 Whistle of the Winter Wind
 The Bell Ringer
 The Red Cat Beckons
 Footman's Demise
 Destroy Hot Stones
 Seven-Ri Runner
 Memasho The Cop 
 Floating Lanterns
 Beginning of Winter
 The Female Inspector
 Resolute Women
 Suio Style Zanbato Blade
 The Living Dead
 An Ill Star
 Thirteen Strings
 Sayaka

Season 3
Season three ran from April 4 to September 26, 1976. 
 Seeking Immortality
 Wet Nurse's Parasol
 No Tomorrow
 The Silk Cloud
 A Mother's Taste
 Your Life is Mine
 Five Sisters of Death
 Season of Death
 Unfortunate Pair
 Ominous Path
 The Flower of Happiness
 The Hand Cannon
 The Moon of Desire
 Omens Good and Bad
 Abe the Monster
 Wildfire
 The Scent
 The Roaring Thunder
 Light on the River of Blood
 The Showdown
 Impending Death
 Fathers and Sons
 Attack in the Shadows
 The Guardian
 Waves and Flutes
 Swordsmanship

Series 2002–2004

References

External links
 
 
The 1973–1976 series on DVDs (now out of print)

Lists of Japanese drama television series episodes